Histurodes is a genus of moths belonging to the family Tortricidae.

Species
Histurodes costaricana Razowski, 1984
Histurodes taetera Razowski, 1984

References

 , 2005: World Catalogue of Insects volume 5 Tortricidae.
 , 1984, Acta zool. cracov. 27: 213.

External links
tortricidae.com

Polyorthini
Tortricidae genera
Taxa named by Józef Razowski